"Rock'n Roll Band" is a song by Swedish pop group ABBA (then credited as "Björn & Benny with Anna & Frida") from the album Ring Ring.

In the US, the song was released in July 1973 as their third single on Playboy Records credited to "Björn & Benny with Anna & Frieda" (with an 'E' added to Frida). The flipside was the previous single "Another Town, Another Train" (keeping its original label, catalogue number and A-side matrix number, 50018-A). The Ring Ring album was not released in the United States until 1995. 

In the UK, it was released as the B-side to "Ring Ring" when issued in October 1973, and when re-issued in June 1974. As in the US, the Ring Ring album was not released so these two tracks were the only ones from the album to be released in the UK until more were included on Greatest Hits in 1976. "Rock'n Roll Band" was not available on an album in the UK until Ring Ring was eventually released in 1992.

In South Africa and Rhodesia, it was released as the B-side to "Another Town, Another Train" on the Sunshine label in February 1974.

There are at least two known versions of this track: the 3.11 version released as ABBA, and a shorter early mix, released on the remastered version of Lycka by Benny & Bjorn.

Track listings
Stock pressing
 A. "Rock'n Roll Band"
 B. "Another Town, Another Train"

Promo pressings
 A. "Rock'n Roll Band" [mono]
 B. "Rock'n Roll Band" [stereo]

References

External links

1973 singles
ABBA songs
Songs about rock music
Songs written by Benny Andersson and Björn Ulvaeus
Playboy Records singles